Czech Republic competed at the inaugural 7 sports 2018 European Championships from 2 to 12 August 2018. It competed in 6 sports.

Medallists

Aquatics

Swimming

Men

Women

Synchronised swimming

Athletics

Men 
Track and road

Field events

Combined events – Decathlon

Women 
Track and road

Field events

Combined events – Heptathlon

External links
 European Championships official site 

2018
Nations at the 2018 European Championships
2018 in Czech sport